"In View" is a song by Canadian rock group The Tragically Hip. It was released in August 2006 as the lead single from their tenth full-length studio album, World Container. The song reached number one on Billboard's Canada Rock chart. "In View" also peaked at number one on the Canada Rock Top 30 chart in Radio & Records magazine.

References

2006 singles
The Tragically Hip songs
2006 songs
Universal Music Group singles
Number-one singles in Canada
Song recordings produced by Bob Rock